New Alipurduar  is one of the four railway stations that serve Alipurduar city in Alipurduar district in north Bengal in the Indian state of West Bengal. Its station code is NOQ.

History
During British rule, all links from the northern part of Bengal and Assam to the rest of India were through the eastern part of Bengal. The most important connection was the Calcutta–Parbatipur–Haldibari–Siliguri link first established in 1878 and then developed in stages (for details see Howrah–New Jalpaiguri line). During the nineteenth century, Lalmonirhat was linked to the Dooars. In pre-independence days, a  railway track running via Radhikapur, Biral, Parbatipur, Tista, Gitaldaha and Golokganj connected Fakiragram in Assam with Katihar in Bihar.

With the partition of India in 1947, all these links were lost. Indian Railways took up the Assam Link Project in 1948 to build a rail link between Fakiragram and Kishanganj. Fakiragram was connected to the Indian railway system in 1950 through the Indian portion of north Bengal with a  track. The New Jalpaiguri–New Bongaigaon section was partly new construction, partly old line converted to  broad gauge in 1966. The 265 km long  broad gauge Siliguri–Jogihopa railway line was constructed between 1963 and 1965.

Importance over other adjacent stations
Most of the long-distance trains from other parts of India pass through and stop at New Alipurdur railway junction as it is connected with double track to Assam and the rest of Bengal. The older Alipurduar Junction was on metre-gauge track that was converted to broad gauge much later and fewer trains pass through Alipurduar Jn station.
This station is the biggest railway station in Alipurduar , with stopping over more than 90+ trains daily and 3trains daily originating

Major Trains
 New Delhi–Dibrugarh Rajdhani Express (Via New Tinsukia)
 New Delhi–Dibrugarh Rajdhani Express (Via Moranhat)
 New Delhi–Dibrugarh Rajdhani Express (Via Rangapara North)
Sir M. Visvesvaraya Terminal–Kamakhya AC Superfast Express
Silchar - Thiruvananthapuram Aronai Superfast Express
Silchar - Coimbatore Superfast Express
Silchar - Sealdah Kanchanjunga Express
Dibrugarh–Kanyakumari Vivek Express
Dibrugarh– Chennai Tambaram Express
Dibrugarh–Amritsar Express
Dibrugarh–Chandigarh Express
Dibrugarh - Lokmanya Tilak Terminus Superfast Express
Dibrugarh-Lalgarh Avadh Assam Express
Dibrugarh–Kolkata Superfast Express
Dibrugarh-Howrah Kamrup Express via Guwahati
Dibrugarh–Howrah Kamrup Express Via Rangapara North
Silghat Town - Tambaram Nagaon Express
Silghat Town - Kolkata Kaziranga Express
Agartala - Sealdah Kanchanjunga Express
New Tinsukia–Bengaluru Weekly Express
New Tinsukia–Rajendra Nagar Weekly Express
New Tinsukia - Darbhanga Jivachh Link Express
Guwahati - Jammu Tawi Lohit Express
Guwahati- Sir M. Visvesvaraya Terminal Kaziranga Superfast Express
Guwahati - Bikaner Express
Guwahati - Okha Dwarka Express
Guwahati - Barmer Express
Guwahati–Secunderabad Express
Guwahati-Jammu Tawi Amarnath Express
Guwahati - Lokmanya Tilak Terminus Express
Guwahati-Howrah Saraighat Superfast Express
Guwahati - Kolkata Garib Rath Express
Kamakhya–Shri Mata Vaishno Devi Katra Express
Kamakhya–Gandhidham Superfast Express
Kamakhya - Jodhpur, Bhagat Ki Kothi Express
Kamakhya - Delhi Brahmaputra Mail
Kamakhya - Puri Express (via Adra)
Kamakhya–Gaya Express
Kamakhya - Delhi Northeast Express
New Alipurduar - Sealdah Padatik Superfast Express
Silchar-Trivandrum Superfast Express
Bamanhat - Sealdah Uttar Banga Express
New Jalpaiguri - Bongaigaon Express
New Alipurdiar - Sealdah Teesta Torsha Express

References

External links
 New Jalpaiguri–New Bongaigaon section
 Northeast Frontier Railway zone
 Alipurduar junction railway station
 Alipurduar

Alipurduar railway division
Railway stations in Alipurduar district
Transport in Alipurduar